Tomato pizza may refer to:

Any pizza topped with tomatoes
Italian tomato pie, a thick-crusted baked good

See also
 List of tomato dishes